Oliver Coleman (born 17 March 1983), is a British actor. He attended Bedales School in Petersfield, Hampshire. He has two brothers and a sister, Daisy Coleman.

Biography 
Coleman portrayed Toby in The Line of Beauty (2006) and Henry Percy in The Other Boleyn Girl (2008), along with cameo appearances in Primeval and Ashes to Ashes.

Coleman played Jed in Vertigo Films' 2012 low-budget horror film The Facility (originally titled Guinea Pigs) directed by Ian Clark.

In 2012 Coleman joined the cast of Casualty in the role of paediatric specialist Dr Tom Kent, making his first appearance on screen on 7 January. He left the show on 14 December 2013 alongside his partner Charlotte Salt.

Oliver then went on to make an appearance in Endeavour which aired on Easter Sunday 2014.

Personal life
On 31 July 2014, Coleman married his Casualty co-star Charlotte Salt in Somerset. Salt gave birth to the couple's first child, a son, in 2017.

Filmography

References

External links
 

British male television actors
Living people
1983 births